The Coolpix P7000 is a digital compact camera introduced by the Nikon Corporation in 2010.

Features

References

External links 

COOLPIX P7000 Product page at Nikon USA

P7000
Cameras introduced in 2010